Espeto may refer to:
 Espeto (food), a fish dish from Málaga and the Granada Coast in Southern Spain
 Gabriel Strefezza (born April 1997), nicknamed Espeto, Brazilian footballer
 Espeto (footballer, born November 1997) (Genilson dos Santos Júnior), Brazilian footballer